Eight was an unincorporated community located in McDowell County, West Virginia, United States. The Eight post office  closed in 1936.

See also

 List of places with numeric names

References 

Unincorporated communities in West Virginia
Unincorporated communities in McDowell County, West Virginia
Coal towns in West Virginia